The Bengal Film Journalists' Association Awards is the oldest Association of Film critics in India, founded in 1937. Frequent winners  include Shashikala (3 awards).

The list
Here is a list of the award winners and the films for which they won.

See also

 BFJA Awards
 Bollywood
 Cinema of India

References 

 

Bengal Film Journalists' Association Awards